Arcola is a city in Fort Bend County, Texas, United States, within the Houston–Sugar Land–Baytown metropolitan area. The population was 2,034 as of the 2020 census, up from 1,642 at the 2010 census, up from 1,048 at the 2000 census.

Arcola incorporated in 1986.

Geography

Arcola is located near the eastern edge of Fort Bend County at  (29.501339, –95.463760). Texas State Highway 6 passes through the city, leading northwest  to Sugar Land and southeast 14 miles to Alvin.

Demographics

As of the 2020 United States census, there were 2,034 people, 596 households, and 487 families residing in the city.

As of the census of 2010, there were 1,640 people, 295 households, and 233 families residing in the city. The population density was 548.5 people per square mile (211.9/km2). There were 324 housing units at an average density of 169.6 per square mile (65.5/km2). The racial makeup of the city was 34.26% White, 34.16% African American, 0.38% Native American, 2.19% Asian, 27.10% from other races, and 1.91% from two or more races. Hispanic or Latino of any race were 51.91% of the population.

There were 295 households, out of which 46.1% had children under the age of 18 living with them, 56.6% were married couples living together, 18.6% had a female householder with no husband present, and 20.7% were non-families. 16.6% of all households were made up of individuals, and 6.4% had someone living alone who was 65 years of age or older. The average household size was 3.55 and the average family size was 4.06.

In the city, the population was spread out, with 37.4% under the age of 18, 9.5% from 18 to 24, 28.5% from 25 to 44, 16.0% from 45 to 64, and 8.5% who were 65 years of age or older. The median age was 28 years. For every 100 females, there were 101.9 males. For every 100 females age 18 and over, there were 92.9 males.

The median income for a household in the city was $31,607, and the median income for a family was $32,500. Males had a median income of $26,818 versus $21,172 for females. The per capita income for the city was $11,735. About 24.3% of families and 26.8% of the population were below the poverty line, including 34.3% of those under age 18 and 26.4% of those age 65 or over.

Government and infrastructure
Law enforcement is provided by the Arcola Police Department, The Police Chief is Michael V. Ellison. Fire protection is provided by the Fresno Fire Department. Emergency medical service is provided by Fort Bend County EMS.

Fort Bend County does not have a hospital district. OakBend Medical Center serves as the county's charity hospital which the county contracts with.

Education 
Arcola pupils attend schools in Fort Bend Independent School District (FBISD). FBISD formed in 1959 by the consolidation of Missouri City Independent School District and the Sugar Land Independent School District.

The community is within the East Division, controlling school board slots 5 through 7. Most of the city is zoned to Heritage Rose Elementary School, Billy Baines Middle School, and Ridge Point High School. The section north and east of Texas State Highway 6 and north and west of Farm to Market Road 521 is zoned to Burton Elementary School, Lake Olympia Middle School, and Hightower High School.

History of schools

At the time FBISD formed, in 1959, there was one school for black students in Arcola, Oaklane Elementary School, serving grades 1–8. Black students in grades 9–12 were assigned to M.R. Wood School in Sugar Land. White students, at the time, were assigned to an elementary school in Missouri City, a junior high school in Sugar Land, and a high school in Missouri City. Those sites now house E. A. Jones Elementary School, Lakeview Elementary School, and Missouri City Middle School, respectively. Dulles High School became established as the white high school of FBISD. Desegregation occurred in 1965, and Oaklane closed at that time. Oaklane students were reassigned to Blue Ridge Elementary School in Blue Ridge, now a part of Houston. Dulles Junior High School served as FBISD's sole junior high school from March 1965 to August 1975. After desegregation, Dulles High was the only zoned high school in the district until Willowridge High School in Houston opened in 1979.

Previously all pupils north of State Highway 6 attended Burton Elementary School in unincorporated Fort Bend County. Some pupils south of Highway 6 attended Sienna Crossing Elementary School, and other pupils south of Highway 6 attended Schiff Elementary School in unincorporated Fort Bend County.

Prior to the opening of Hightower in 1998, Elkins High School served Arcola. After 1998 and prior to 2010 all Arcola pupils were zoned to Hightower.

Transportation
Houston Southwest Airport, a general aviation airport, is in the Arcola city limits.

References

External links

 City of Arcola official website
 

Cities in Texas
Cities in Fort Bend County, Texas
Greater Houston